Douglas Head (Manx: Kione Ghoolish) is a rocky point on the Isle of Man overlooking Douglas Bay and harbour. Views extend to include Snaefell Mountain and Laxey.

General

Until 1870, the headland was owned by The Nunnery Estate when Sir John Goldie-Taubman gave part of it to 'the people of Douglas' by donating it to Douglas Town Council.  The headland was a popular area during the Victorian tourism period with access available via South Quay or by using the three steam ferries of Douglas Harbour Ferry Service.

Current facilities
 Douglas Head Lighthouse
 Manx Radio

Historic facilities

 Douglas Head Amphitheatre
 Douglas Head Hotel
 Grand Union Camera Obscura
 The Black Mast
 Warwick Tower
 Douglas Head Funicular Railway
 Douglas Head Marine Drive Railway
 Port Skillicon Pool
 Douglas Head Restaurant

Memorials
Douglas Head is home to three memorials:
 A statue of RNLI founder and Isle of Man resident Sir William Hillary who was the man behind the building of the Tower of Refuge on Conister Rock
 A large stone anchor is dedicated to the contribution and sacrifice made by Manx people during the Battle of Trafalgar and was placed on the headland marking the bi-centenary of that event
 A granite bollard and plinth from the harbourside in the Isle of Whithorn, giving thanks from the families and friends of those lost their lives in the Solway Harvester whose bodies were recovered by the Manx Government contrary to previous maritime tradition

Trivia
 During the Second World War Douglas Head was the location of a major radar station called HMS Valkyrie
 Extensive radar research, development and training of systems and operators took place here
 Manx Radio, broadcasting from the head, was the first licensed independent station in the British Isles
 Marine Drive was a toll road, and the impressive arched gateway was the toll gate
 Evidence of the tramway exists in the landside arch where the overhead cable was attached to the stonework
 The road runs the full length of Marine Drive however is closed to through traffic due to rock instability
 Sections of the 1999 film Waking Ned were filmed on Marine Drive

External links
Manx Notebook

Headlands of the Isle of Man
Douglas, Isle of Man
Tourist attractions in the Isle of Man